The 2007 West Asian Football Federation Women's Championship was held in Amman, Jordan.  It was the second West Asian Football Federation Women's Championship held.  Four teams competed and Jordan, the hosts and defending champions, won the tournament.

Results

References

2007
2007–08 in Jordanian football
International association football competitions hosted by Jordan
2007 in Asian football
WAFF